"The Bare Necessities" is a jazz song, written by Terry Gilkyson, from the animated 1967 Disney film The Jungle Book, sung by Phil Harris as Baloo and Bruce Reitherman as Mowgli.

Background
Originally, it was written for an earlier draft of the movie that was never produced. The Sherman Brothers, who wrote the other songs of the film, kept this as the only song used from the previous version. A reprise of the song was sung by Sebastian Cabot as Bagheera and Phil Harris as Baloo at the end of the film. Van Dyke Parks worked on the arrangement. The song was also sung by Louis Armstrong. In 1967, "The Bare Necessities" was nominated for an Academy Award for Best Original Song but lost to "Talk to the Animals" from Doctor Dolittle. A hip-hop version of the song performed by Lou Rawls was used as the theme song for Jungle Cubs.

In other media
Brian Wilson covered it on his album In the Key of Disney, which was released on October 25, 2011.

Certifications

References

1967 songs
1967 singles
Songs from The Jungle Book (1967 film)
Songs written by Terry Gilkyson
Walt Disney Records singles